Put-in-Bay Township is one of the twelve townships of Ottawa County, Ohio, United States.  The 2000 census found 763 people in the township, 635 of whom lived in the unincorporated portions of the township.

Communities
Put-in-Bay is a village located at  within the southern portion of the township. Put-In-Bay is located on the center of South Bass Island. 
Gibraltar Island is an unincorporated community located on Gibraltar Island. The Ohio State University's  Stone Laboratory is located in Gibraltar Island. The summer house of Jay Cooke is located in Gibraltar Island.
Isle Saint George is an unincorporated community located at  within the northern portion of the township on North Bass Island.
Middle Bass is an unincorporated community located at  within the center of the township on Middle Bass Island.

Geography

Islands
The township is composed of several islands located in Lake Erie, northeast of the rest of the county:

Boundaries
It has the following water boundaries:
Ontario, Canada - northeast
Kelleys Island - east
Catawba Island Township - southeast
Portage Township - south
Erie Township - southwest, southeast of Erie Township
Carroll Township - southwest, northwest of Erie Township
Jerusalem Township, Lucas County - northwest

Several communities are located in Put-in-Bay Township: the popular tourist village of Put-in-Bay on South Bass Island, and the unincorporated communities of Middle Bass on Middle Bass Island and Isle St. George on North Bass Island.

AVAs
One American Viticultural Area has been established in the township:
 Isle St. George AVA

Demographics

2010
As of the census of 2010, there were 633 people, 313 households, and 184 families residing in the township. The racial makeup of the township was 99.1% White, 0.3% Asian, Hispanic or Latino of any race were 0.5% of the population.

There were 633 households, out of which 46.2% had children under the age of 18 living with them, 58.8% were married couples living together, 19.8% had a female householder with no husband present.

Name and history
It is the only Put-in-Bay Township statewide.

Government
The township is governed by a three-member board of trustees, who are elected in November of odd-numbered years to a four-year term beginning on the following January 1. Two are elected in the year after the presidential election and one is elected in the year before it. There is also an elected township fiscal officer, who serves a four-year term beginning on April 1 of the year after the election, which is held in November of the year before the presidential election. Vacancies in the fiscal officership or on the board of trustees are filled by the remaining trustees.

Township officials

References

External links
Township website
County website

Townships in Ottawa County, Ohio
Townships in Ohio